{{DISPLAYTITLE:C19H30O}}
The molecular formula C19H30O (molar mass: 274.44 g/mol, exact mass: 274.2297 u) may refer to:

 3α-Androstenol
 3β-Androstenol, also known as 5α-androst-16-en-3β-ol

Molecular formulas